Walter William Cobb (born 29 September 1940), known as Billy Cobb, was an English footballer who scored 38 goals from 199 appearances in the Football League playing for Nottingham Forest, Plymouth Argyle, Brentford and Lincoln City. He played in midfield. He went on to play for Boston United in the Northern Premier League.

Cobb was the scorer of Nottingham Forest's first goal in European football, in a 5–1 defeat to Valencia in the 1961–62 Fairs Cup. He scored a hat-trick on his Lincoln City debut, in an 8–1 defeat of Luton Town. After retiring from football he kept a pub in Nottingham and managed the bars at Nottingham Ice Stadium.

References

1940 births
Living people
Sportspeople from Newark-on-Trent
Footballers from Nottinghamshire
English footballers
Association football midfielders
Nottingham Forest F.C. players
Plymouth Argyle F.C. players
Brentford F.C. players
Lincoln City F.C. players
Boston United F.C. players
English Football League players
Northern Premier League players